The Ireland women's under-19 cricket team represents Ireland in international under-19 women's cricket. The team is administrated by Cricket Ireland.

The team played their first official matches at the 2023 ICC Under-19 Women's T20 World Cup, the first ever international women's under-19 cricket competition, in which they reached the Super Six round.

History
The inaugural Women's Under-19 World Cup was scheduled to take place in January 2021, but was postponed multiple times due to the COVID-19 pandemic. The tournament was eventually scheduled to take place in 2023, in South Africa. As a Full Member of the ICC, Ireland qualified automatically for the tournament.

Ireland announced their 15-player squad for the tournament on 1 December 2022. Glenn Querl, Head Coach of Scorchers, was chosen as Head Coach of the side for the tournament. At the tournament, qualified for the Super Six group stage from the initial group stage, beating Indonesia, but lost all their matches in their Super Six group.

Recent call-ups
The table below lists all the players who have been selected in recent squads for Ireland under-19s. Currently, this only includes the squad for the 2023 ICC Under-19 Women's T20 World Cup.

Records & statistics
International match summary

As of 23 January 2023

Youth Women's Twenty20 record versus other nations

As of 23 January 2023

Under-19 World Cup record

References

Women's Under-19 cricket teams
C
Ireland in international cricket